Pernús is one of 13 parishes (administrative divisions) in the Colunga municipality, within the province and autonomous community of Asturias, in northern Spain.

The population is 97 (INE 2007).

Villages
 Beldréu
 El Conyéu
 Pernús

References

Parishes in Colunga